The 2018 South Australian National Football League season (officially the SANFL Macca’s League) was the 139th season of the South Australian National Football League (SANFL) Australian rules football competition.

The season commenced on Friday, 30 March (Good Friday) and concluded with the SANFL Grand Final on Sunday, 23 September. , who had finished last in 2017 and fifth place at the end of the home-and-away season, defeated minor premier  by 19 points to win their fourteenth premiership, their first since 1991.

Premiership Season

Round 1

Round 2

Round 3

Round 4

Round 5

Round 6

State Game

Round 7

Round 8

Round 9

Round 10

Round 11

Round 12

Round 13

Round 14

Round 15

Round 16

Round 17

Round 18

Round 19

Ladder

Finals series

Qualifying and Elimination Finals

Semi-finals

Preliminary final
The preliminary final was highly controversial after it was discovered that North Adelaide played part of the final quarter with nineteen men on the field.

Woodville-West Torrens led North Adelaide by as much as 47 points during the third quarter, before North Adelaide staged a comeback, and by three-quarter time the lead was only twenty points, Woodville-West Torrens 10.8 (68) to North Adelaide 7.6 (48). At the start of the final quarter, North Adelaide midfielder Aiden Tropiano, who was listed as starting the quarter on the bench, instead took to the field, and North Adelaide played the first 3:39 with nineteen on the field before the club recognised its error and took the extra man off the ground. During that time, Woodville-West Torrens officials are understood to have complained to the reserve umpire and interchange steward, but no head count was staged – as this procedure requires the team captain to request one from the on-field umpire – nor was a free kick awarded. North Adelaide scored 1.2 (8) during the period of the extra man.

The rest of the quarter was high-scoring and thrilling, with Woodville-West Torrens pushing the margin back out to 21 points, before North Adelaide kicked seven straight goals in twelve minutes of play to take a 22-point lead in the 23rd minute of the game. Woodville-West Torrens responded, kicking three goals in five minutes, just falling short of completing their own comeback. At the final siren, North Adelaide 15.10 (100) defeated Woodville-West Torrens 14.11 (95) by five points. Immediately, the eight points North Adelaide had scored with the extra man on the field came under question.

On Monday 17 September, Woodville-West Torrens lodged an official protest against the result, and a 
SANFL tribunal hearing was held on Monday night. After the hearing, the tribunal ruled that North Adelaide's five point win would stand, owing to there being no provision in the SANFL constitution, rules or regulations allowing for the result to be changed in these circumstances; but it fined the club $10,000 and docked four premiership points from the club's 2019 result. The national Laws of the Game were amended the following season, introducing a formal provision for a league to review, identify and impose a penalty (including reversal of the match result) for an incident of too many players on the ground if that incident was identified in a post match video review, without a head count having been executed during the match.

Grand Final

References

South Australian National Football League seasons
SANFL